Caersws Football Club is a football team, playing in the Ardal Leagues North East.

The club was founded in 1887 as Caersws Amateurs, and adopted the present name when amateur status was dropped in 1974. The team plays at the Recreation Ground, Caersws, which accommodates 4000 spectators (500 seated).

The team's first choice strip is blue shirts, white shorts and blue socks. The second choice strip is orange shirts, black shorts and orange socks.

History 
Although founded in the late 19th century, the club enjoyed little if any success until the 1960s when it won the Mid-Wales League in 1959–60, 1960–61, and 1962–63, and appeared in three Welsh Amateur Cup finals, winning the cup in 1960–61. They also won the cup (now renamed the Welsh Intermediate Cup) in 1989. In the league, the team's fortunes waned until they won the title again in 1978, and four more times before they were invited to join the Cymru Alliance in 1990. In 1992 they became founder members of the League of Wales.

Caersws won the League Cup in 2000–01 and 2001–02, and played in the Intertoto Cup, being defeated 3–1 on aggregate by PFC Marek Dupnitsa of Bulgaria.

Biggest victories and losses 
Biggest win: 20–1 v. Aberystwyth Town in 1962.
Biggest defeat: Unknown
Biggest League of Wales defeat: 0–7 v. Total Network Solutions in 1995.

Honours 
Welsh League Cup
Winners (3): 2000–01, 2001–02, 2006–07
Runners-up (1): 1992–93

Welsh Intermediate Cup 
Winners (1): 1988–89
Runners-up (2): 1983–84, 1991–92

Welsh Amateur Cup
Winners (1): 1960–61
Runners-up (3): 1952–53, 1962–63, 1963–64

Central Wales Challenge Cup
Winners (6): 1977–78, 1988–89, 1991–92, 2010–11, 2014–15, 2017–18
Runners-up (3): 1978–79, 1979–80, 1984–85

Cymru Alliance League
Champions (1): 1991–92
Runners-up (1): 1990–91

Cymru Alliance League Cup
Winners (1): 2014–15
Runners-up (3): 1990–91, 2011–12, 2012–13

Mid Wales League
Champions (9): 1959–60, 1960–61, 1962–63, 1977–78, 1982–83, 1985–86, 1988–89, 1989–90, 1996–97
Runners-up (8): 1953–54, 1958–59, 1961–62, 1963–64, 1976–77, 1978–79, 1984–85, 1987–88

Mid Wales League Cup
Winners (6): 1979–80, 1982–83, 1987–88, 1989–90, 1990–91, 1991–92
Runners-up (7): 1953–54, 1954–55, 1960–61, 1969–70, 1984–85, 1986–87, 1988–89

Montgomeryshire Amateur League Cup
Winners (3): 2011–12, 2012–13, 2014–15
Runners-up (1): 1985–86

Village Cup
Winners (4): 1983–84, 2011–12, 2012–13, 2013–14

J Emrys Morgan Cup
Runners-up (2): 1984–85, 2013–14

Mongomeryshire CupWinners:'''  1952–53, 1959–60, 1962–63, 1969–70, 1970–71, 1971–72, 1974–75, 1976–77, 1977–78, 1982–83, 1983–84, 1984–85, 1985–86, 1986–87, 1987–88, 1988–89, 1989–90, 1990–91, 2001–02

Europe

References

External links 
 Official Website
 Club guide on a Welsh Premier League Football

Caersws
Sport in Powys
Mid Wales Football League clubs
1887 establishments in Wales
Football clubs in Wales
Association football clubs established in 1887
Cymru Premier clubs
Cymru Alliance clubs
Ardal Leagues clubs
Montgomeryshire Football League clubs